Eddington is a census-designated place located in Bucks County, Pennsylvania, United States.  The community was part of Cornwells Heights-Eddington, which was split into two separate CDPs.  As of the 2010 census, the population was 1,906. The community is served by the Eddington station along SEPTA Regional Rail's Trenton Line.

Demographics

See also
Bensalem Township

References

External links
http://www.livingplaces.com/PA/Bucks_County/Bensalem_Township/Eddington_Park.html

Census-designated places in Bucks County, Pennsylvania
Census-designated places in Pennsylvania